Romantic Blue: The Series (literally: "the whole world for you only") is a 2020 Thai television series remake of the 1995 film with the same title starring Thitiwat Ritprasert (Ohm), Prachaya Ruangroj (Singto) and Tipnaree Weerawatnodom (Namtan).

Directed by Ong-Art Singlumpong, the series premiered on Channel 8 and iQIYI on 12 December 2020, airing on Saturdays and Sundays at 21:40 ICT.

Cast and characters 
Below are the cast of the series:

Main 
 Thitiwat Ritprasert (Ohm) as Thiti Seang-Ngeing (Mai)
 Prachaya Ruangroj (Singto) as Thada Seang-Ngeing (Mhen)
 Tipnaree Weerawatnodom (Namtan) as Sutatinee Supaworakran (Pon)

Supporting 
 Somchai Khemglad (Tao) as To
  as Thongchai (Bo) (To Friend) 
 Suttida Kasemsan Na Ayutthaya (Nook) as Anong (Mai and Mhen Mother) 
  (Nong) as Thiwakorn Seang-Ngeing (Thio) (Mai and Mhen Father) 
 Prin Wikran (Por) as Pornchai Supaworakran (Cheksong) (Pom Father)
  (Bank) as Khem (Henchman To) 
 Ratri Chamthewi (June) as Muai (Henchman To)  
  (Play) as Kannika Kawpecha (New) (Pom Friend)

Cameo appearance 
  as Nursing (Ep.1,6)
  as Nursing (Ep.1,2,4,8)
  as Doctor (Ep.2,4,5,8) 
  as Somyot Laomala (customers who come to repair the saloon) (Ep.7,10)
  (Af) as News presenter Channel 8 (Ep.10)
  (Looked) as News presenter Channel 8 (Ep.10)
  (May) as News presenter Channel 8 (Ep.10)  
  as Sukhum pongpaiboon (Executive of luxury car company PEGASUS) (Ep.10)   
  as Royal Thai Police (Ep.10)    
  as Royal Thai Police (Ep.10)

References

External links 
 Channel 8

Thai drama television series
2020 Thai television series debuts
2021 Thai television series endings
Channel 8 (Thailand) original programming